A circumstellar envelope (CSE) is a part of a star that has a roughly spherical shape and is not gravitationally bound to the star core. Usually circumstellar envelopes are formed from the dense stellar wind, or they are present before the formation of the star. Circumstellar envelopes of old stars (Mira variables and OH/IR stars) eventually evolve into protoplanetary nebulae, and circumstellar envelopes of young stellar objects evolve into circumstellar discs.

Types of circumstellar envelopes 
 Circumstellar envelopes of AGB stars
 Circumstellar envelopes around young stellar objects

See also 
 Circumstellar dust
 Common envelopes
 Stellar evolution

References

External links 
 The Structure and Evolution of Envelopes and Disks in Young Stellar Systems 

Stellar evolution